Kyra Shroff (born 17 October 1992) is an Indian former professional tennis player.

She has career-high WTA rankings of 470 in singles, achieved on 4 March 2013, and 358 in doubles, reached on 30 January 2017. Shroff won ten ITF doubles titles.

She made her WTA Tour main-draw singles debut at the 2007 Sunfeast Open where she was given a wildcard.

Playing for the India Fed Cup team, Shroff has a win–loss record of 0–2.

ITF Circuit finals

Singles: 1 (runner-up)

Doubles: 22 (10 titles, 12 runner-ups)

References

External links
 
 
 

1992 births
Indian female tennis players
Racket sportspeople from Mumbai
Living people
21st-century Indian women
21st-century Indian people
Sportswomen from Maharashtra